A strain is an acute or chronic soft tissue injury that occurs to a muscle, tendon, or both. The equivalent injury to a ligament is a sprain. Generally, the muscle or tendon overstretches and partially tears, under more physical stress than it can withstand, often from a sudden increase in duration, intensity, or frequency of an activity. Strains most commonly occur in the foot, leg, or back. Immediate treatment typically includes five steps abbreviated as P.R.I.C.E.: protection, rest, ice, compression, elevation.

Signs and symptoms
Typical signs and symptoms of a strain include pain, functional loss of the involved structure, muscle weakness, contusion, and localized inflammation. A strain can range from mild overstretching to severe  tears, depending on the extent of injury.

Cause
A strain can occur as a result of improper body mechanics with any activity (e.g., contact sports, lifting heavy objects) that can induce mechanical trauma or injury. Generally, the muscle or tendon overstretches and is placed under more physical stress than it can withstand. Strains commonly result in a partial or complete tear of a tendon or muscle, or they can be severe in the form of a complete tendon rupture. Strains most commonly occur in the foot, leg, or back. Acute strains are more closely associated with recent mechanical trauma or injury. Chronic strains typically result from repetitive movement of the muscles and tendons over a long period of time.

Degrees of Injury (as classified by the American College of Sports Medicine):
 First degree (mildest) – little tissue tearing; mild tenderness; pain with full range of motion.
 Second degree – torn muscle or tendon tissues; painful, limited motion; possibly some swelling or depression at the spot of the injury.
 Third degree (most severe) – limited or no movement; severe acute pain, though sometimes painless straight after the initial injury

To establish a uniform definition amongst healthcare providers, in 2012 a Consensus Statement on suggested new terminology and classification of muscle injuries was published.

The classifications suggested were:
 The major difference suggested was the use of "indirect" muscle injury verse "grade 1" to provide subclassifications when advanced images were negative.

Indirect Muscle Injury
FUNCTIONAL (Negative MSK US & MRI) 
 Type 1: Overexertion-related Muscle Disorder
 Type 1a: Fatigue induced
 Type 1b: DOMS
• Type 2: Neuromuscular muscle disorder
 Type 2a: Spine-Related
 Type 2b: Muscle-Related

STRUCTURAL MUSCLE INJURY (Positive MSK US & MRI)
• Type 3: Partial Muscle Tear
• Type 4: (Sub) total tear

DIRECT MUSCLE INJURY
•  Bump or Cut: Contact-related

Risk factors
Although strains are not restricted to athletes and can happen while doing everyday tasks, people who play sports are more at risk for developing a strain.  It is common for an injury to develop when there is a sudden increase in duration, intensity, or frequency of an activity.

Treatment
The first-line treatment for a muscular strain in the acute phase include five steps commonly known as P.R.I.C.E.

 Protection: Apply soft padding to minimize impact with objects. 
 Rest: Rest is necessary to accelerate healing and reduce the potential for re-injury.
 Ice: Apply ice to induce vasoconstriction, which will reduce blood flow to the site of injury. Never ice for more than 20 minutes at a time.
 Compression: Wrap the strained area with a soft-wrapped bandage to reduce further diapedesis and promote lymphatic drainage.
 Elevation: Keep the strained area as close to the level of the heart as is possible in order to promote venous blood return to the systemic circulation.

Immediate treatment is usually an adjunctive therapy of NSAIDs and Cold compression therapy. Cold compression therapy acts to reduce swelling and pain by reducing leukocyte extravasation into the injured area.  NSAIDs such as Ibuprofen/paracetamol work to reduce the immediate inflammation by inhibiting Cox-1 and Cox-2 enzymes, which are the enzymes responsible for converting arachidonic acid into prostaglandin. However, NSAIDs, including aspirin and ibuprofen, affect platelet function (this is why they are known as "blood thinners") and should not be taken during the period when tissue is bleeding because they will tend to increase blood flow, inhibit clotting, and thereby increase bleeding and swelling. After the bleeding has stopped, NSAIDs can be used with some effectiveness to reduce inflammation and pain.

A new treatment for acute strains is the use of platelet rich plasma (PRP) injections which have been shown to accelerate recovery from non-surgical muscular injuries.

It is recommended that the person injured should consult a medical provider if the injury is accompanied by severe pain, if the limb cannot be used, or if there is noticeable tenderness over an isolated spot. These can be signs of a broken or fractured bone, a sprain, or a complete muscle tear.

See also
 Achilles tendon rupture
 Pulled hamstring
 Repetitive strain injury

References

External links 

Dislocations, sprains and strains
Muscular disorders